"Scene In San Francisco" is a song by the American singer-songwriter Ed Hale. It was released on January 17, 2012 as the third single from his solo album, Ballad On Third Avenue. The song was written by Ed Hale and the drummer of Ed Hale and The Transcendence, William Sommer and produced by Ed Hale and Fernando Perdomo.

Track listing
 Digital download
 "Scene In San Francisco" – 3:54

Release history

References

External links
Official website

2012 singles
Songs about San Francisco
2009 songs